Bosnia and Herzegovina has sent athletes to every edition of the quadrennial Mediterranean Games since the nation's first appearance at the 1993 Mediterranean Games following its independence from Yugoslavia. As of 2018, Bosnian athletes have won a total of 38 medals.

Medal tables

Medals by sport

List of medalists

Athletes with most medals

The Bosnian and Herzegovian athletes who won the most gold medals in the history of the Mediterranean Games is the swimmer Lana Pudar and the most medals winner is the shot putter Hamza Alić.

Notes: athletes in bold are still active.

See also
Bosnia and Herzegovina at the Olympics
Bosnia and Herzegovina at the Paralympics

External links
Medals table per country and per Games at the official International Committee of Mediterranean Games (CIJM) website